The 2013–14 season is the 7th season in the Football League played by Dagenham & Redbridge F.C., an English football club based in Dagenham, Greater London. It is their third consecutive season in Football League Two after relegation from Football League One in 2011. The season covers the period from 1 July 2013 to 30 June 2014.

Match details
League positions are sourced from Statto, while the remaining contents of each table are sourced from the references in the "Ref" column.

League table

Football League Two

FA Cup

League Cup

Football League Trophy

Squad statistics

Numbers in parentheses denote appearances as substitute.
Players with names struck through and marked  left the club during the playing season.
Players with names in italics and marked * were on loan from another club for the whole of their season with Dagenham & Redbridge.
Players listed with no appearances have been in the matchday squad but only as unused substitutes.
Key to positions: GK – Goalkeeper; DF – Defender; MF – Midfielder; FW – Forward

Transfers

In

Out

Loans in

Loans out

References

2013-14
2013–14 Football League Two by team